Magnus Källander (born 6 February 1969) is a Swedish football coach and former footballer. His last club was  Stenungsunds IF.

Honours

Club
Västra Frölunda IF
Division 1 Västra: 1991

Örgryte IS
Svenska Cupen: 1999–2000
Superettan: 2008

Stenungsunds IF
Division 4 Bohuslän/Dalsland: 2011

Individual
Swedish Goal of the Year: 2000

References

External links

1969 births
Living people
Association football midfielders
Västra Frölunda IF players
Örgryte IS players
Swedish footballers
Allsvenskan players
Superettan players
Ettan Fotboll players
Iraklis Thessaloniki F.C. players
Super League Greece players
Swedish expatriate footballers
Expatriate footballers in Greece
Swedish expatriate sportspeople in Greece